The 1989 Player's International Canadian Open was a tennis tournament played on outdoor hard courts. The men's tournament was held at the du Maurier Stadium in Montreal in Canada and was part of the 1989 Nabisco Grand Prix while the women's tournament was held at the National Tennis Centre in Toronto in Canada and was part of the Category 5 tier of the 1989 WTA Tour. The men's tournament was held from August 14 through August 20, 1989, while the women's tournament was held from August 21 through August 27, 1989.

Finals

Men's singles

 Ivan Lendl defeated  John McEnroe 6–1, 6–3
 It was Lendl's 7th title of the year and the 86th of his career.

Women's singles
 Martina Navratilova defeated  Arantxa Sánchez Vicario 6–2, 6–2
 It was Navratilova's 11th title of the year and the 274th of her career.

Men's doubles
 Kelly Evernden /  Todd Witsken defeated  Charles Beckman /  Shelby Cannon 6–3, 6–3
 It was Evernden's 2nd title of the year and the 7th of his career. It was Witsken's 3rd title of the year and the 7th of his career.

Women's doubles
 Gigi Fernández /  Robin White defeated  Martina Navratilova /  Larisa Savchenko 6–1, 7–5
 It was Fernández's 2nd title of the year and the 11th of her career. It was White's 1st title of the year and the 9th of her career.

See also
 Lendl–McEnroe rivalry

References

External links
 
 Association of Tennis Professionals (ATP) tournament profile
 Women's Tennis Association (WTA) tournament profile

Player's Canadian Open
Player's Canadian Open
Player's Canadian Open
Player's Canadian Open
Canadian Open (tennis)